"The Only One" is the third single by Japanese singer Kiyotaka for his first studio album, I'll Be There (2001). It was written by Kiyotaka and TJ Fisher. The song was released on April 18, 2001.

Critical reception
CD Journal gave the song a positive review saying "it's like a hymn purifying our hearts".

Commercial performance
In Japan, "The Only One" achieved a big success, charting at No. 12 on the Oricon Weekly Singles Chart and No. 82 on the Oricon Yearly Singles Chart.
This song was sold over 400,000 copies so far.

Usage in media
"The Only One" was used in the Japanese drama "Pure Soul ~Kimi ga boku wo wasuretemo~".

Live performance
In 2001, he performed this song on the Japanese popular music program "Music Station" twice.

Track listing

Maxi Single

Personnel
Kiyotaka – vocals, lyrics, chorus arranger
TJ Fisher – composer
Seiki Morisaki – engineer
Yasuji Maeda – engineer
Yukie Fuse – engineer (assistant)
Hideya Nakazaki – producer, engineer

Charts and certifications

Weekly Charts

Yearly Charts

Certifications

References

External links
Ki-Yo Official Website - The Only One

2001 singles
2001 songs
EMI Music Japan singles